Gareth Wright (born 20 November 1981) is a Welsh professional golfer who made the cut at the 2013 Open Championship, one of only two Welshmen to make the cut (the other being Jamie Donaldson). He had secured his place in the 2013 Open through a playoff in final qualifying. As an amateur, Wright represented Wales in the Eisenhower Trophy as well as in the European Amateur Team Championship.

Wright is now a club pro and in 2012 won the British Club Pros' Championship.

Professional wins (5)
2012 Glenmuir PGA Professional Championship
2014 Scottish PGA Championship
2015 PGA Play-offs
2016 Scottish PGA Championship
2018 Northern Open

Results in major championships

CUT = missed the half-way cut
"T" = tied

Team appearances
Amateur
Eisenhower Trophy (representing Wales): 2004
European Amateur Team Championship (representing Wales): 2003, 2005

Professional
PGA Cup (representing Great Britain and Ireland): 2013 (tie), 2015 (winners)

References

External links

Welsh male golfers
European Tour golfers
1981 births
Living people